A partial solar eclipse occurred on Sunday, February 3, 1935. A solar eclipse occurs when the Moon passes between Earth and the Sun, thereby totally or partly obscuring the image of the Sun for a viewer on Earth. A partial solar eclipse occurs in the polar regions of the Earth when the center of the Moon's shadow misses the Earth.

Related eclipses

Solar eclipses 1931–1935

References

External links 
 http://eclipse.gsfc.nasa.gov/SEplot/SEplot1901/SE1935Feb03P.GIF

1935 in science
1935 02 03
February 1935 events